Arents is a Dutch and German patronymic surname ("son of Arent"). The form Arentsz is primarily known as a patronym. Notable people with the surname include:

 Albert Arents (1840–1914), German-American metallurgist
 Grace Arents (1848–1926), American philanthropist
 George Arents (1916–1992), American racing driver
 Jupp Arents (1912–1984), German racing cyclist
 Mareks Ārents (born 1986), Latvian track and field athlete
 Marretje Arents (c. 1712–1748), Dutch fishwife and rebellion leader
Arentsz
 Arent Arentsz (Cabel) (1585–1631), Dutch painter
 Tyman Arentsz. Cracht (c.1595–1646), Dutch painter

See also
 Arent (disambiguation)
 Arends, Dutch surname
 Grace Arents Free Library

References 

Dutch-language surnames
German-language surnames
Patronymic surnames